Racing Boy is a brand that manufactures motorcycle aftermarket parts and accessories. The brand started in Malaysia since 1995. Thousands of products have been produced: including rims, absorber, braking system, engine parts, handling system, etc. Because of the popularity and international image, Racing Boy renamed and re-branded in 2014 to RCB.

History 
Racing Boy was established in 1995 by Mr. Lee Meng Tek from Bukit Mertajam, Pulau Pinang. Initially, this brand was registered under Asian Alloy Enterprise. Later in 1998, Mr. Lee expanded his business by moving to Selangor state, city of Malaysia. To rebrand, Racing Boy has been re-registered and incorporated under a new company named Meng Kah Auto Parts Trading Sdn Bhd (MKA). Since then, the Racing Boy brand operates its business in Puchong Utama Industrial Area.

Dealerships and distributors 
With thousands of local authorized dealers in Malaysia, Racing Boy also has main distributors in overseas: including Singapore, Philippines, Cambodia, Vietnam, Thailand, Indonesia, Bermuda and Greece.

Racing Boy apparels and localite industries

Awards 
2011 - “Super Golden Product” in the “2nd Asia Success Award” organized by Asia Success Inc. Alliance & Asia Success Inc. Branding Magazine
 
2012 - “11th Asia Pacific Top Excellence Brand” organized by the Asia Pacific Excellence Entrepreneur Alliance

References

External links 
 

1995 establishments in Malaysia
Motorcycle manufacturers of Malaysia
Joint ventures
Auto parts suppliers of Malaysia
Automotive companies established in 1995
Privately held companies of Malaysia
Malaysian brands